An age-restricted community is a residential community, often gated, that legally discriminates on the basis of age to limit residency to a majority fraction of older individuals—typically 80% over a set age. The minimum age is frequently set at 55 years old, but it can vary.

These communities are set up to accommodate older individuals who would like to live in an area without the perceived problems of having children around. In most cases a younger spouse or significant other is permitted to live in the community as long as one member meets the minimum age requirement.

Age-qualified communities, also known as 55+ communities, active adult communities, lifestyle communities, or retirement communities, are often planned communities that offer homes and community features that are attractive to 55+ adults. These might include a clubhouse or lifestyle center with a good many activities, sometimes with indoor and outdoor swimming pools, exercise facilities, craft rooms, demonstration kitchens, and decks and patios for gathering.

Canada
A noteworthy Canadian example, Arbutus Ridge Seaside Community for Active Adults in the Cowichan Valley on Vancouver Island, was the first comprehensive retirement community built in Canada. It is a private community that subsequently became the template and proving ground for what has become accepted and commonplace. In 2015, that template was expanded in line with the growing desire for spiritually focused retirement living as Global Kingdom Ministries unveiled Trinity Ravine Towers in Toronto, one of the country's first Christian community living condominium complexes.

United States

According to 55places.com, Florida has the most age-restricted communities with more than 375 communities, with New Jersey coming in second with more than 230 age-restricted communities.  Other popular states for age-restricted communities include Oregon, North Carolina, South Carolina, Pennsylvania, and Utah.

While in the United States discrimination in housing is generally prohibited, the Fair Housing Act of 1968 and the Housing for Older Persons Act of 1995 (109 STAT. 787) allow communities to restrict residency to older individuals. Individuals may buy into these properties regardless of age; however, the owner may be prohibited from occupying the property according to the association declarations and bylaws.

According to research compiled by TRI Pointe Homes, there are 75 million people who comprise the boomer generation and over 32 million of these who are over the age of 55 would consider living in an age-restricted community.

Costs
With most age restricted communities, there are homeowner association (HOA) fees that cover services and amenities to resident such as golf courses, game nights, clubhouses, pools, and landscaping. In the United States, these fees can range from $100 — $500 a month.

Communities

Criticism 
A common problem occurs when the homeowner dies; if the surviving resident does not meet the requirements for ownership, then he or she is forced to sell the home.  This can happen even if the survivor is the spouse of the deceased. However, many age-restricted communities have circumvented this issue by allowing the survivor to maintain residency as noted in the deed restrictions.

Another common problem arises when a change in the family situation renders a grandparent responsible for a grandchild. Often grandchildren are prohibited from living more than a short time (often 90 days) in a community.

References

External links 
 

Planned cities
Housing for the elderly
Segregation
Ageism